Vernon Township is one of twelve townships in Jackson County, Indiana, United States. As of the 2010 census, its population was 3,419 and it contained 1,494 housing units.

Geography
The stream of Lewis Branch runs through this township.

Cities and towns
 Crothersville

Unincorporated towns
 Retreat
 Uniontown

Extinct towns
 Langoons
 Newry

Adjacent townships
 Marion Township, Jennings County (northeast)
 Spencer Township, Jennings County (northeast)
 Jennings Township, Scott County (southeast)
 Finley Township, Scott County (south)
 Gibson Township, Washington County (southwest)
 Grassy Fork Township (west)
 Washington Township (northwest)

Cemeteries
The township contains five cemeteries: Bedel, Crothersville, Gorrell, Grassy, New Hope and Uniontown

Major highways
  Interstate 65
  U.S. Route 31
  State Road 250
  State Road 256

References
 U.S. Board on Geographic Names (GNIS)
 United States Census Bureau cartographic boundary files

External links
 Indiana Township Association
 United Township Association of Indiana

Townships in Jackson County, Indiana
Townships in Indiana